Medroy Williams (born 17 May 1953) is a Jamaican cricketer. He played in one first-class match for the Jamaican cricket team in 1984/85.

See also
 List of Jamaican representative cricketers

References

External links
 

1953 births
Living people
Jamaican cricketers
Jamaica cricketers
People from Saint Mary Parish, Jamaica